Uman (Quechua uma head, -n a suffix, also spelled Umán) is a  mountain in the Cordillera Central in the Andes of Peru. It is located in the Lima Region, Yauyos Province, on the border of the districts of Miraflores and Tanta. Uman lies west of a lake named Pisququcha and northeast of Wayna Qutuni, Qutuni and Altarniyuq.

References

Mountains of Peru
Mountains of Lima Region